Cooper Township is located in Sangamon County, Illinois. As of the 2010 census, its population was 893 and it contained 345 housing units.

The unincorporated community of Buckhart was located at the intersection of Buckhart and Young Roads, and the Buckhart Cemetery is now also known as the Cooper Cemetery and commonly as Oak Hill Cemetery.

Geography

Demographics

References

External links
City-data.com
Illinois State Archives

Townships in Sangamon County, Illinois
Springfield metropolitan area, Illinois
Townships in Illinois